Percy Arrowsmith (13 March 1900 – 15 June 2005) and Florence "Flo" Arrowsmith (31 October 1904 – 9 April 2007) were, until Percy's death, a long time married couple residing in Hereford, England.

Life
On 1 June 2005, they erroneously made it into Guinness World Records for the longest marriage for a living couple and the oldest aggregate age of a married couple. They had been married for 80 years, having married in Hereford in 1925, three years after they met.

However, the Le Monde newspaper revealed that one couple in France was even older together and married for a longer time than the Arrowsmiths: André Léon Alphonse Debry (15 June 1898 - 31 August 2005) and Marguerite Pingaud (10 October 1903 - January 2006) wed on 12 August 1924 and celebrated their 81st wedding anniversary in August 2005 shortly before the husband's death.

Percy died only exactly two weeks later on at age 105 and Florence followed almost two years afterwards at age 102.

Sources
CBS News: Couple Celebrates 80th Anniversary
BBC obituary for Percy Arrowsmith
Ledbury Reporter obituary for Florence Arrowsmith

English centenarians
Married couples